Dicopper chloride trihydroxide  is the chemical compound with the formula Cu2(OH)3Cl.  It is often referred to as tribasic copper chloride (TBCC), copper trihydroxyl chloride or copper hydroxychloride.  It is a greenish crystalline solid encountered in mineral deposits, metal corrosion products, industrial products, art and archeological objects, and some living systems.  It was originally manufactured on an industrial scale as a precipitated material used as either a chemical intermediate or a fungicide.  Since 1994, a purified, crystallized product has been produced at the scale of thousands of tons per year, and used extensively as a nutritional supplement for animals.

Natural occurrence

Cu2(OH)3Cl occurs as natural minerals in four polymorphic crystal forms: atacamite, paratacamite,  clinoatacamite, and botallackite.  Atacamite is orthorhombic, paratacamite is rhombohedral, and the other two polymorphs are monoclinic.  Atacamite and paratacamite are common secondary minerals in areas of copper mineralization and frequently form as corrosion products of Cu-bearing metals.

The most common Cu2(OH)3Cl polymorph is atacamite.  It is an oxidation product of other copper minerals, especially under arid, saline conditions.  It was found in fumarolic deposits, and a weathering product of sulfides in subsea black smoker deposits.  It was named for the Atacama Desert in Chile.  Its color varies from blackish to emerald green.  It is the sugar-like coating of dark green glistening crystals found on many bronze objects from Egypt and Mesopotamia.  It has also been found in living systems such as the jaws of the marine bloodworm Glycera dibranchiata.  The stability of atacamite is evidenced by its ability to endure dynamic regimes in its natural geologic environment.

Paratacamite is another Cu2(OH)3Cl polymorph that was named for the Atacama Desert in Chile.  It has been identified in the powdery light-green corrosion product that forms on a copper or bronze surface – at times in corrosion pustules.  It can be distinguished from atacamite by the rhombohedral shape of its crystals.

Botallackite is the least stable of the four Cu2(OH)3Cl polymorphs.  It is pale bluish-green in color.  This rare mineral was first found, and later identified, in the Botallack Mine in Cornwall, England.  It is also a rare corrosion product on archaeological finds.  For instance, it was identified on an Egyptian statue of Bastet.

The fourth polymorph of Cu2(OH)3Cl family is clinoatacamite.   It was found and identified around in Chuquicamata, Chile in 1996.  It was named in allusion to its monoclinic morphology and relationship to atacamite.  It too is pale green but has monoclinic crystals.  Clinoatacamite can be easily confused with the closely related paratacamite.  It is believed that clinoatacamite should replace most previously reported occurrences of paratacamite in the conservation literature.

Structure

Atacamite is orthorhombic, space group Pnma, with two crystallographically independent Cu and hydroxyl oxygen atoms in the asymmetric unit.  Both Cu atoms display characteristically Jahn-Teller distorted octahedral (4+2) coordination geometry: each Cu is bonded to four nearest OH groups with Cu-OH distance of 2.01Å; in addition, one of Cu atoms is bonded to two Cl atoms (at 2.76Å) to form a [Cu(OH)4Cl2] octahedron, and the other Cu atom is bonded to one Cl atom (at 2.75Å) and a distant OH group (at 2.36Å) to form a [Cu(OH)5Cl] octahedron.  The two different types of octahedron are edge-linked to form a three-dimensional framework with the [Cu(OH)5Cl] octahedron cross-linking the [Cu(OH)4Cl2] octahedron layers parallel to (110) (Figure 1).

Botallackite crystallizes in monoclinic with space group P21/m.  Like in atacamite, there are two different types of Cu coordination geometries: Jahn-Teller distorted octahedral [Cu(OH)4Cl2] and [Cu(OH)5Cl].  But these octahedra assemble in different ways.  Each octahedron shares six edges with surrounding octahedra, forming a two-dimensional sheet-type structure parallel to (100).  The adjacent sheets are held together by hydrogen bonding between the hydroxyl oxygen atoms of one sheet and the opposing chlorine atoms in the other sheets.  The resulting weak bonding between the sheets accounts for the perfect (100) cleavage and the typical platy habit of botallackite (Figure 2).

Paratacamite is rhombohedral, space group R3.  It has a well-developed substructure with a’=a/2, c’=c, apparent space group R3m.  There are four crystallographically independent Cu atoms in the asymmetric unit.   The Cu atoms display three different types of octahedral coordination geometries.  Three quarters of the Cu atoms are coordinated to four near OH groups and two distant Cl atoms, giving the expected (4+2) configuration [Cu(OH)4Cl2].  Three sixteenths of the Cu atoms are bonded to two near OH groups at 1.93Å and four stretched OH groups at 2.20Å to form an axially compressed (2+4) octahedral [Cu(OH)6], and the remaining one sixteenth of the Cu atoms are bonded to six equivalent OH groups at 2.12Å to form a regular octahedral [Cu(OH)6].  The Jahn-Teller distorted [Cu(OH)4Cl2] octahedra share the edges and form partially occupied layers parallel to (001), and the compressed and regular [Cu(OH)6] octahedra cross-link the adjacent [Cu(OH)4Cl2] octahedral layers to form a three-dimensional framework.  The existence of the regular octahedral [Cu(OH)6] is unusual, and it has been shown that partial substitution of Zn or Ni for Cu at this special site (3b) is necessary to stabilize paratacamite structure at ambient temperature.  Due to the high symmetry of the special position, only about 2 wt% Zn is necessary to stabilize the rhombohedral structure.  In fact, most of paratacamite crystals studied contain significant amounts of Zn or Ni (>2 wt%) (Figure 3).

Clinoatacamite is monoclinic, space group P21/m.  The structure is very close to that of paratacamite.  But the [Cu(OH)6] octahedron is Jahn-Teller distorted.  The Jahn-Teller distorted [Cu(OH)4Cl2] octahedra share the edges to form partially occupied layers parallel to (101).  This layer is topologically the same as that in mica.  Adjacent layers of octahedra are offset, such that vacant sites in one sheet align with occupied sites in the neighboring sheet.  The [Cu(OH)6] octahedra link the layers to form a 3-dimensional network (Figure 4).

Thermodynamic data based on the free energy of formation indicates that the order of stability of these polymorphs is clinoatacamite>atacamite> botallackite.  Spectroscopic studies show that the strength of hydrogen bonding in these polymorphs is in the order paratacamite >atacamite> botallackite.  Studies on the formation of basic copper chloride indicate botallackite is a key intermediate and crystallizes first under most conditions; subsequent recrystallization of botallackite to atacamite or paratacamite depends on the nature of reaction medium.

Properties

Dicopper chloride trihydroxide Cu2(OH)3Cl is a green crystalline solid.  It decomposes above 220 °C with elimination of hydrochloric acid to oxides of copper.  It is largely stable in neutral media, but decomposes by warming in alkaline media, yielding oxides.  It is virtually insoluble in water and organic solvents, soluble in mineral acids yielding the corresponding copper salts (eq. 1), soluble in ammonia, amine and EDTA solutions under complex formation.  It can easily be converted to copper hydroxide by reacting with sodium hydroxide (eq. 2).  Its pH in water is 6.9 measured by EPA method SW846-9045.

Cu2(OH)3Cl +  3 HCl  →  2 CuCl2  +   3 H2O                  (eq.1)

Cu2(OH)3Cl +  NaOH  → 2Cu(OH)2  + NaCl                               (eq.2)

Most of the published scientific literature on the properties of the compound has focused on specimens found as natural minerals or corrosion products on copper alloys, or prepared under laboratory conditions.

Traditionally reported preparation routes

Hydrolysis of CuCl2

Cu2(OH)3Cl can be prepared by hydrolysis of a CuCl2 solution at pH 4 ~7.  A variety of bases such as sodium carbonate, ammonium, calcium, or sodium hydroxide may be used (eq. 3).

2CuCl2  +  3 NaOH  →  Cu2(OH)3Cl +  3 NaCl                            (eq.3)

Cu2(OH)3Cl can also be prepared by the reaction of a hot CuCl2 solution with freshly precipitated CuO (eq. 4).

CuCl2  +  3 CuO + 3 H2O  →  2 Cu2(OH)3Cl                   (eq.4)

If sufficient chloride ions are present in solution, hydrolysis of CuSO4 with alkali also produces Cu2(OH)3Cl (eq. 5).

2 CuSO4  +  3 NaOH  +  NaCl →  Cu2(OH)3Cl  +  2 Na2SO4                 (eq.5)

Industrial production

Air oxidation of Cu(I)Cl in brine solution

Prior to 1994, large scale industrial production of basic copper chloride was devoted to making either a fungicide for crop protection or an intermediate in the manufacture of other copper compounds.  In neither of those applications was the polymorphic nature of the compound, or the size of individual particles of particular importance, so the manufacturing processes were simple precipitation schemes.

Cu2(OH)3Cl can be prepared by air oxidation of Cu(I)Cl in brine solution.  The Cu(I)Cl solution is usually made by reduction of CuCl2 solutions over copper metal.  A CuCl2 solution with concentrated brine is contacted with copper metal until the Cu(II) is completely reduced.  The resulting Cu(I)Cl is then heated to 60 ~ 90 °C and aerated to effect the oxidation and hydrolysis.  The oxidation reaction can be performed with or without the copper metal.  The precipitated product is separated and the mother liquor containing CuCl2 and NaCl, is recycled back to the process (eq. 6 ~ 7).

CuCl2  +  Cu + 2 NaCl  →  2 NaCuCl2                                   (eq.6)
6 NaCuCl2  +  3/2 O2  +  H2O  →  2 Cu2(OH)3Cl  +  2 CuCl2  + 6 NaCl        (eq.7)

The product from this process is of fine particle with size of 1 ~ 5 µm and is usable as an agricultural fungicide.

Micronutrients process

In 1994, an unusually efficient, economic, reliable and green process was developed for commercial production of a purified and crystallized form of tribasic copper chloride.  It results in a stable, free-flowing, non-dusty green powder with typical particle size of 30 ~ 100 micron.  The combination of its density and particle size distribution results in blending and handling characteristics beneficial in preparation of uniform animal feed mixtures.

Initially, that new process was designed to utilize spent etchant streams from the electronic printed circuit board manufacturing industry as starting materials.

There are two types of spent etching solutions from printed circuit board manufacturing operations: an acidic cupric chloride solution (CuCl2/HCl), and an alkaline cuprammine chloride solution (Cu(NH3)4Cl2).  Tribasic copper chloride is generated by neutralization of either one of these two solutions (acidic or alkaline pathway), or by combination of these two solutions, a self-neutralization reaction.

In the acidic pathway, the cupric chloride solution can be neutralized with caustic soda, or ammonia, lime, or other base.

In the alkaline pathway, cuprammine chloride solution can be neutralized with HCl or other available acidic solutions (eq. 8).

2 [Cu(NH3)4Cl2]  +  5 HCl  +  3 H2O  →  Cu2(OH)3Cl  +    8 NH4Cl           (eq. 8)

More efficiently, the two spent etching solutions are combined under mild acidic conditions, one neutralizing the other, to produce higher yield of basic copper chloride (eq. 9).

3 [Cu(NH3)4Cl2]  +  5 CuCl2  +  12 H2O  →  4 Cu2(OH)3Cl  +    12 NH4Cl         (eq. 9)

Seeding is introduced during crystallization.  The production is operated continuously under well-defined conditions (pH, feeding rate, concentrations, temperature, etc.).  Product with good particle size is produced and can be easily separated from background salt and other impurities in the mother liquor.  After simple rinse with water and drying, pure, free-flowing, non-dusty green crystalline solid with typical particle size of 30 ~ 100 micron is obtained.  The product from this process is predominantly atacamite and paratacamite, the stable crystal forms of basic copper chloride – and is called alpha basic copper chloride for simplicity.  Careful control of process conditions to favor the alpha polymorphs results in a product that remains free flowing over extended storage times, thus avoiding caking as occurs with both copper sulfate and the botallackite crystal form - also called beta basic copper chloride.  This process has been used to manufacture thousands of tons of tribasic copper chloride every year, and has been the predominant route of commercial production since it was introduced by Micronutrients in 1994.

Applications

As an agriculture fungicide

Fine Cu2(OH)3Cl has been used as a fungicidal spray on tea, orange, grape, rubber, coffee, cardamom, and cotton etc., and as an aerial spray on rubber for control of phytophthora attack on leaves.

As a pigment

Basic copper chloride has been used as a pigment and as a colorant for glass and ceramics.  It was widely used as a coloring agent in wall painting, manuscript illumination, and other paintings by ancient people.  It was also used in cosmetics by ancient Egyptians.

In pyrotechnics

Cu2(OH)3Cl has been used as a blue/green coloring agents in pyrotechnics.

As a catalyst

Cu2(OH)3Cl has been used in the preparation of catalysts and as a catalyst in organic synthesis for chlorination and/or oxidation.

Cu2(OH)3Cl has been shown to be a catalyst in the chlorination of ethylene.

Atacamite and paratacamite crystal forms of Cu2(OH)3Cl have been found to be active species in supported CuCl2 catalyst systems for the oxidative carbonylation of methanol to dimethyl carbonate.  A number of supported Cu2(OH)3Cl catalysts have also been prepared and studied in such conversion.    Dimethyl carbonate is an environmentally benign chemical product and unique intermediate with versatile chemical reactivity.

Cu2(OH)3Cl has been identified as a new catalytically active material for the partial oxidation of n-butane to maleic anhydride.

A mixture of ultrafine powder CuO/Cu2(OH)3Cl has been shown to be good in photo-catalytic decolorization of dyes, such as amido black, and indigo carmine.

As a commercial feed supplement

Copper is one of the most critically important of the trace minerals that are essential elements in numerous enzymes that support metabolic functions in most organisms.  Since the early 1900s, copper has routinely been added to animal feedstuffs to support good health and normal development.  Starting in the 1950s, there was increasing focus on the issue of bioavailability of trace mineral supplements which led to copper sulfate pentahydrate becoming the predominant source.  Because of its high water solubility, and thus hygroscopicity, CuSO4 leads to destructive reactions in feed mixtures.  These are notoriously destructive in hot, humid climates.  Recognition that basic copper chloride would reduce feed stability problems led to issuance of patents on the use of the compound as a nutritional source.

Subsequently, animal feeding studies revealed that the alpha crystal form of basic copper chloride has a rate of chemical reactivity that is well matched to biological processes.  The strength of the bonds holding copper in the alpha crystal polymorphs could prevent undesirable, anti-nutritive interactions with other feed ingredients while delivering controlled amounts of copper throughout the active zones in the digestive tract of an animal.

Success in producing alpha basic copper chloride on a large scale allowed for the widespread application of basic copper chloride in the feed thereby supplying the copper requirements of all major livestock groups.  This form of the compound has proven to be particularly suitable as a commercial feed supplement for use in livestock and aquaculture due to its inherent chemical and physical characteristics. Compared to copper sulfate, the alpha crystal form of basic copper chloride provides many benefits including improved feed stability, less oxidative destruction of vitamins and other essential feed ingredients; superior blending in feed mixtures, and reduced handing costs.  It has been widely used in feed formulations for most species, including chickens, turkeys, pigs, beef and dairy cattle, horses, pets, aquaculture and exotic zoo animals.

References

Coordination complexes
Nutrition
Copper(II) minerals